University Recording Company is a Hollywood based record label that existed from 1945 to 1947. The label operated exclusively via sales through the U.S. Mail, and its president was composer/songwriter Jimmy Richards. The label released 78rpm records by musicians such as Red Nichols, Pinky Tomlin, Al Donahue, and The Ginger Snaps.

See also
 List of record labels

References
Footnotes

Further reading
Entry for "University Recording Company". Allan Sutton, American Record Companies and Producers, 1888 - 1950. Mainspring Press, 2018. .

1945 establishments in California
1947 disestablishments in California
American record labels
Record labels disestablished in 1947
Record labels established in 1945